Local elections will be held in the Province of Rizal on May 9, 2016 as part of the 2016 general election. Voters will select candidates for all local positions: a municipal/city mayor, vice mayor and town councilors, as well as members of the Sangguniang Panlalawigan, the governor, vice-governor and representatives for the two districts of Rizal.

Provincial Elections Results

For Governor 
Governor Rebecca "Nini" Ynares defeated her closest rival Esteban Salonga in a huge margin.

For Vice Governor 
Board Member Reynaldo "Junrey" San Juan Jr. defeated Reynaldo Manuel.

For Representatives

First District 
Michael John "Jack" Duavit Duavit won the elections.

Second District 
Rep. Isidro Rodriguez Jr. was re-elected.

Antipolo's First District 
Chiqui Roa-Puno defeated First District Councilor Juanito "Dudok" Lawis.

Antipolo's Second District
Rep. Romeo Acop won unopposed.

For Provincial Board Members

First District 
Municipalities: Angono, Binangonan, Cainta, Taytay

Second District 
Municipalities: Baras, Cardona, Jala-Jala, Morong, Pililla, Rodriguez (Montalban), San Mateo, Tanay, Teresa

Antipolo's First District 
Enrico "Doc Rico" de Guzman was re-elected for third and final term.

Antipolo's Second District 
Jesus Angelito "Joel" Huertas was re-elected for third and final term.

City and Municipality Elections Results

All municipalities and City of Antipolo in Rizal will elect mayor and vice-mayor this election. The candidates for mayor and vice mayor with the highest number of votes wins the seat; they are voted separately, therefore, they may be of different parties when elected. Below is the list of mayoralty and vice-mayoralty candidates of each city and municipalities per district.

First District
Municipalities: Angono, Binangonan, Cainta, Taytay

Angono
Mayor Gerardo "Gerry" Calderon was re-elected.

Vice Mayor Antonio "Sonny" Rubin was re-elected unopposed.

Binangonan
Former Mayor Cesar Ynares won the elections.

Mayor Cecilio Ynares was elected as vice mayor.

Cainta
Mayor Johnielle Keith Nieto was re-elected as mayor.

Vice Mayor Sofia "Pia" Velasco was re-elected as vice-mayor.

Taytay
Mayor Janet De Leon-Mercado was defeated by former mayor George Ricardo Gacula.

Vice Mayor Carlito Gonzaga was re-elected.

Second District
Municipalities: Baras, Cardona, Jala-Jala, Morong, Pililla, Rodriguez (Montalban), San Mateo, Tanay, Teresa

Baras
Katherine Robles was re-elected.

Willfredo Robles was re-elected.

Cardona
Mayor Bernardo San Juan was re-elected unopposed.

Vice Mayor Teodulo "Totoy" Campo was re-elected unopposed.

Jala-Jala
Former Mayor Elionor Pillas won the elections unopposed.

Mayor Narciso Villaran was defeated by Jose "Jolet" Delos Santos

Morong
Mayor Armando San Juan defeated Vice Mayor Joseph Buenaventura.

Ricardo Halina won the elections.

Pililla
Dan Masinsin defeated his closest rival, Anna Masikip, daughter of Mayor Leandro Masikip Sr.

Mayor Leandro Masikip, Sr. defeated his closest rival, Nico Juanario Patenia

Rodriguez (Montalban)
Cecilio Hernandez was re-elected.

Dennis Hernandez won the elections.

San Mateo
Vice Mayor Cristina Diaz, wife of Mayor Jose Rafael Diaz, won the elections.

Mayor Jose Rafael Diaz, defeated John Patrick Bautista.

Tanay
Rex Manuel Tanjuatco, son of Mayor Rafael Tanjuatco, won the elections.

Vice Mayor Jaime Vista was re-elected.

Teresa
Mayor Raul Palino was re-elected.

Vice Mayor Jose Jeriel Villegas was re-elected

Antipolo

Mayor Casimiro "Jun" Ynares III defeated his closest rival Vice Mayor Ronaldo "Puto" Leyva.

First District Councilor Josefina "Pining" Gatlabayan, wife of former Mayor Angelito Gatlabayan, defeated former Vice Mayor Danilo "Nilo" Leyble in elections.

References

2016 Philippine local elections
Elections in Rizal
2016 elections in Calabarzon